The Farka Lake is an artificial lake and municipal park in the southeast of Tirana, Albania. It is about 9.6 km away from the city centre of Tirana, and is administered by the Agency of Parks and Recreation of the Municipality of Tirana.

Geography 

The lake is about 75 hectare, larger than the Artificial Lake of Tirana. It has a maximum length of two kilometers as well as a maximum width of 700 meters. The dam at the south is about 300 metres long.

See also 
 Tirana
 Landmarks in Tirana

References

External links 
 Agency of Parks and Recreation Tirana

Bodies of water of Tirana
Parks in Tirana
Tourist attractions in Tirana